Marquis Gōng of Cai (Cài Gōnghóu 蔡宮侯) (?–?), born as Ji ? (姬?), was the fourth ruler of the State of Cai. He was the only known son of Earl Huang of Cai (蔡伯荒) and close kin of King of Zhou. He was the first in the family to hold the title of the Marquis of Cai (Cai Guohou 蔡国侯) which would be in use until the end of the State of Cai in 447 BC.  He was succeeded by his son.

References 
 Shiji
 
 

Zhou dynasty nobility
Cai (state)
10th-century BC Chinese monarchs